Antonio Mistrorigo (26 March 1912 – 14 January 2012) was an Italian prelate of the Roman Catholic Church. At the time of his death, he was the oldest Italian bishop as well as one of the oldest Catholic bishops.

Biography 
Mistrorigo was born in Chiampo, Italy and was ordained a bishop on 7 July 1935. Mistrorigo was appointed Bishop of Lucera-Troia (formerly the diocese of Troia) on 9 March 1955 and received his episcopal consecration on 25 April 1955. On 25 June 1958, he was appointed Bishop of Treviso and served Treviso until his retirement on 19 November 1988.

He had authored several books including  "L'arte Sacra: Dizionario Dai Documenti Del Concilio Vaticano II E Del Postconcilio" and "Il Credente Del Terzo Millennio".

External links 
 Catholic-Hierarchy
 Diocese of Treviso

20th-century Italian Roman Catholic bishops
Bishops of Lucera
Bishops of Treviso
1912 births
2012 deaths
Participants in the Second Vatican Council